Cysteine and glycine-rich protein 1 is a protein that in humans is encoded by the CSRP1 gene.

CSRP1 is a member of the CSRP family of genes encoding a group of LIM domain proteins, which may be involved in regulatory processes important for development and cellular differentiation. The LIM/double zinc-finger motif found in CRP1 is found in a group of proteins with critical functions in gene regulation, cell growth, and somatic differentiation Other genes in the family include CSRP2 and CSRP3.

References

External links

Further reading